The 28th Regiment Illinois Volunteer Infantry was an infantry regiment that served in the Union Army during the American Civil War, commanded by Colonel Amory K. Johnson and later by Lieutenant Colonel Richard Ritter.

Service

The 28th Illinois Infantry was organized at Camp Butler, Illinois (dubbed "Camp Misery" because of overcrowding and poor conditions) seven miles (11 km) northeast of Springfield, Illinois, which had just been opened as a training camp for Illinois soldiers, and was mustered into Federal service on August 15, 1861. Between that date and March 15, 1866, when the regiment was mustered out and then discharged at Camp Butler on May 13, 1866, 290 fatalities were recorded, 184 of them from disease and 106 killed and mortally wounded.

Campaigns
The 28th Illinois Infantry saw action at the Battle of Fort Henry, the momentous, bloody Battle of Shiloh, and the Siege of Corinth, Mississippi.  Grant's Central Mississippi campaign ( November 2, 1862—January 10, 1863) culminated in the Siege of Vicksburg (June 11—July 4, 1863), one of the most important Union victories of the war.  It opened the Mississippi River for the Union and cut the Confederacy in half.  The Vicksburg victory effectively finished the Confederacy in the West, severing Texas, Arkansas and large parts of Louisiana from the remainder of the insurgent states.

Vicksburg's surrender was followed by the campaign against the Confederacy's 4th largest city, Mobile, Alabama, which fell after the siege and capture of Spanish Fort and the Battle of Fort Blakely (February 17—April 12, 1865).  The 28th Illinois Infantry completed later assignments with the occupation of Brazos Santiago, Clarksville, and Brownsville, Texas (July, 1865—March, 1866).

See also
List of Illinois Civil War Units
Illinois in the American Civil War

Notes

References
The Civil War Archive

Units and formations of the Union Army from Illinois
1861 establishments in Illinois
Military units and formations established in 1861
Military units and formations disestablished in 1866
1866 disestablishments in Illinois